Francis "Skipper" Gidney (1890–1928) was an early leader of the Scouting movement in the United Kingdom. He was appointed the first Camp Chief of Gilwell Park in May 1919, and organized the first Wood Badge adult leader training course there in September 1919. He served in the Scouting organization until 1923, and was honoured by having the Gidney Cabin at Gilwell, a training centre, named for him.

Biography
Gidney started one of the first Scout Troops in 1908, when he was only 17 years old. Gidney then served in World War I. He was seriously wounded and invalided out of the army before the Armistice. His position in Scouting led to financial and marital difficulties: he himself complained that he was underpaid, and his wife did not care much for Scouting. The marriage eventually foundered. They had at least three children, one of whom died in 1921. His son, Alan Francis Gidney, later became an officer in the 10th Gurkha Rifles and was mentioned in dispatches during the Burma Campaign.

Gidney established the pen name of "Gilcraft" which he used when writing articles in The Scout and the Headquarters Gazette, also in several instructional books and booklets for both adult Scouters and boys. The pseudonym continued to be used by his successors at Gilwell in the interwar period. It was his idea to start the 1st Gilwell Scout Troop (today the 1st Gilwell Park Scout Group) for all Wood Badge holders, with its distinctive neckerchief, and he successfully established the pattern still used for modern-day Gilwell Reunions.

Disputes over how Gilwell Park should be managed led to Gidney resigning in 1923, which greatly upset the founder of the Scouting movement, Robert Baden-Powell. Gidney then worked as a Master at a preparatory school in Bournemouth, before retiring due to ill health. He died from complications to his war wounds in 1928 at the age of 38. The Frank Gidney Memorial Cabin was built at Gilwell by Don Potter, one of the staff members, who had been given his first set of woodworking tools by Gidney. The cabin was opened by Baden-Powell on Easter Sunday, 1930.

See also

References

1890 births
1928 deaths
The Scout Association
Scouting pioneers